In navies and the maritime industry, damage control is the emergency control of situations that may cause the sinking of a watercraft.

Examples are:

 rupture of a pipe or hull especially below the waterline and
 damage from grounding (running aground) or hard berthing against a wharf.
 temporary fixing of bomb or explosive damage.

Measures used
Simple measures may stop flooding, such as:

 locking off the damaged area from other ship's compartments;
 blocking the damaged area by wedging a box around a tear in the ship's hull,
 putting a band of thin sheet steel around a tear in a pipe, bound on by clamps.

More complicated measures may be needed if a repair must take the pressure of the ship moving through the water. For example:

 Thermal lance cutting around the rupture.
 Oxyacetylene welding or electric arc welding of plates over the rupture.
 Quick-drying cement is applied underwater over the rupture.

Damage control training is undertaken by most seafarers, but the engineering staff are most experienced in making lasting repairs.

Damage control is distinct from firefighting. Damage control methods of fighting fire are based on the class of ship and cater to ship specific equipment on board.

Notable contemporary examples

Particular examples:

 USS Samuel B. Roberts: After an Iranian mine holed the frigate beneath the waterline in 1988, the crew fought fire and flooding that threatened to sink it.
 [[USS Princeton (CG-59)|USS Princeton]]: After an Iraqi naval mine damaged the cruiser during the 1991 Gulf War, her crew fought fires and sealed cracks in the hull, then repaired electronic systems, bringing the Aegis Combat System back on line within 2 hours.
 USS Cole: immediate measures to stop sinking after the ship was bombed in 2000.
 HMS Nottingham: measures to keep the ship afloat after, on 7 July 2002, the Nottingham'' ran aground on the submerged but well-charted Wolf Rock near Lord Howe Island.

See also
Naval architecture

Notes

External links

Nautical terminology
Navies
Ship management